Wampatuck Pond is a  pond in Hanson, Massachusetts. Indian Head Brook both flows in and out of the pond. Along the northern shore of the pond are the Routes 14 and 58 concurrency, Hanson's Town Hall, and a small park. Access to the pond includes a concrete ramp managed by the Town of Hanson suitable for three trailers and six cars. The water quality is impaired due to noxious aquatic plants.

External links
Environment Protection Agency
South Shore Coastal Watersheds - Lake Assessments

Ponds of Plymouth County, Massachusetts
Ponds of Massachusetts